Luban Road is a station on Shanghai Metro Line 4. Service began at the station on 29 December 2007.

References

Shanghai Metro stations in Huangpu District
Line 4, Shanghai Metro
Railway stations in China opened in 2007
Railway stations in Shanghai